Taulant is an Albanian masculine given name and may refer to:
Taulant Çerçizi (born 1981), Albanian footballer 
Taulant Kadrija (born 1993), Slovenian footballer
Taulant Kuqi (born 1985), Albanian footballer
Taulant Marku (born 1994), Albanian footballer
Taulant Seferi (born 1996), Albanian footballer
Taulant Sefgjinaj (born 1986), Albanian footballer
Taulant Xhaka (born 1991), Albanian footballer

Albanian masculine given names